Robert Francis St Clair-Erskine, 4th Earl of Rosslyn (2 March 1833 – 6 September 1890), styled Lord Loughborough from 1851 until 1866, was a British Conservative politician. He served as Captain of the Gentlemen-at-Arms under Lord Salisbury between 1886 and 1890.

Early life
Rosslyn was the son of James St Clair-Erskine, 3rd Earl of Rosslyn, and Frances (née Wemyss). He succeeded his father in the earldom in 1866.

He served under Lord Salisbury as Captain of the Honourable Corps of Gentlemen-at-Arms from 1886 until shortly before his death in September 1890. He was a minor poet and published "Sonnets" in 1883, "A Jubilee Lyric" in 1887 (dedicated to Queen Victoria) and "Sonnets and Poems" in 1889.

Freemasonry
Robert joined Lodge Oswald of Dunnikier together with James Townsend Oswald on 8 April 1867. In addition to being a Grand Master Mason of the Grand Lodge of Scotland between 1870 and 1873, he became Depute Master of Lodge Canongate Kilwinning, No. 2, on 1 August 1853. Lord Rosslyn was the Grand Master of the modern Masonic Great Priory of Scotland from 1884 until his death in 1890.

Personal life
Lord Rosslyn married Blanche Adeliza, great granddaughter of Augustus FitzRoy, 3rd Duke of Grafton and widow of Colonel the Honourable Charles Henry Maynard, on 8 November 1866. They had five children:

 Lady Millicent Fanny St Clair-Erskine (1867–1955), married the 4th Duke of Sutherland
 James Francis Harry St Clair-Erskine, 5th Earl of Rosslyn (1869–1939), who married three times.
 Hon. Alexander FitzRoy St Clair-Erskine (1870–1914), who married Winifrede Baker, a daughter of Henry William Baker of California, in 1905.
 Lady Sybil Mary St Clair-Erskine (1871–1910), married Anthony Fane, 13th Earl of Westmorland.
 Lady Angela Selina Bianca St Clair-Erskine (1876–1950), married Lieutenant-Colonel James Stewart Forbes, of Asloun, Aberdeenshire.

Lord Rosslyn died in Dysart, Fife on 6 September 1890, aged 57. He was buried on 11 September, just west of Rosslyn Chapel, which traditionally has very strong masonic links. The monument is carved in two different types of sandstone. His wife Blanche was later buried with him.

The Countess of Rosslyn survived her husband by over 40 years and died at York Terrace, Regent's Park, London, in December 1933. She was described in her obituary in The New York Times as "one of the last survivors of the great Victorian hostesses". She knew personally many of the most famous people of the Victorian era, including Benjamin Disraeli and William Gladstone.

References

External links
 
 
 
 Great Priory of Scotland

Earls in the Peerage of the United Kingdom
1833 births
1890 deaths
Honourable Corps of Gentlemen at Arms
Lords High Commissioner to the General Assembly of the Church of Scotland
Members of the Privy Council of the United Kingdom
Robert
Scottish Freemasons